born July 10, 1986 in Onna, Okinawa, is a Japanese fashion model, actor, and singer. He is the younger brother of Yu Yamada. His modeling credits include appearing in Men's Non-No and Popeye. He is the leader of the Quiz! Hexagon II singing group Sata Andagi. On July 4, 2021, he announced his retirement from the entertainment industry in 2020. On March 17, 2023, he announced his marriage to a former member of Super Girls, Koume Watanabe.

Filmography

TV drama
 Yamada Tarō Monogatari (TBS, 2007), Masaki Ando
 Yukan Club (NTV, 2007), Kasumi Ura
 Saitō-san (NTV, 2008), Masayoshi Yanagawa
 My Sassy Girl (TBS, 2008), Moichi Gotō
 Innocent Love (Fuji TV, 2008)
 Hanazakari no Kimitachi e (Fuji TV, 2011), Kyōgo Sekime
 Sprout (NTV, 2012), Seiji Okunuki
 Kamen Teacher (NTV, 2013), Shūsaku Endō
 Hell Teacher Nūbē (NTV, 2014), Haruo Watari

Film
 Sakigake!! Otokojuku (2008), Ryūji Toramaru
 Rookies: Graduation (2009)
 Ryujin Mabuyer the Movie: Nanatsu no Mabui (2012), Uruma/Ryujin Mabuyer
 Kamen Teacher (2014), Tōyama Shunsaku

References

External links
  
 

Japanese male actors
Japanese male models
1986 births
Living people
People from Okinawa Prefecture
Ryukyuan people